James Hutton Kidd (12 September 1877–24 October 1945) was a New Zealand horticulturist and community leader. He was born in Hexham, Northumberland, England on 12 September 1877.

References

1877 births
1945 deaths
New Zealand horticulturists
People from Hexham
English emigrants to New Zealand